Casiopea is the debut album of Japanese jazz fusion group Casiopea, released on May 25, 1979. Recorded between December 1978 and March 1979 in Japan, it is Casiopea's self-titled debut album. The record includes the participation of some notable contemporary jazz players such as David Sanborn on the saxophone, giving a special touch to Issei Noro's compositions. Tunes like "Black Joke" are part of the multiple performances and variances along Casiopea's career.

This album was recorded on LP in 1979 as ALR-6017 and years later in 1986 on CD under the 32XA-104 catalog numbers, being the first editions on both LP and CD.

The cover depicts two racecars battling on a circuit, in what could be Fuji Speedway's Hairpin. The cars are late 1970s group 6 sport-prototypes from the japanese Fuji Grand Champion series, most likely a Lola T290 Mazda and a March 74s from the 1978 & 1979 championships.

Track listing

All tracks were written and arranged by Issei Noro except horn arranged by Jun Fukamachi and strings arranged by Hiroki Inui.

Credits and personnel
Musicians
Issei Noro – Electric guitar (Yamaha SG2000), Acoustic guitar, vocals on "Dream Hill"
Minoru Mukaiya –  Fender Rhodes electric piano, Acoustic piano, synthesizers, Yamaha electone, vibraphone
Tetsuo Sakurai – Bass guitar (Fender Jazz Bass)
Takashi Sasaki – Drums
Randy Brecker – Trumpet
Michael Brecker – Tenor saxophone
David Sanborn – Alto saxophone
"Tomato" – Strings

Production and design
Executive Producer – Kunihiko Murai, Syoro Kawazoe
Producer – Shinji Sawada, Kazusuke Obi
Recording engineer – Al Schmitt, Norio Yoshizawa, Yasuhiko Terada
Assistant engineer – Mitsuo Koike
Recording engineer – Neil Dorfsman

Assistant engineer – James Farber
Mixing engineer – Yasuhiko Terada
Art Direction & Design – ALPHABET (nh ad system)
Photographer – Shigeru Wada
Illustrator – Toshikuni Okubo
Remastering engineer – Kouji Suzuki (2016)

Release history

References

External links
 
 

1979 debut albums
Casiopea albums
Alfa Records albums